Hardinxveld Blauwe Zoom is a railway station in Hardinxveld-Giessendam, Netherlands. Train services are operated by Qbuzz.

History
The station opened on 11 December 2011. The station lies on the MerwedeLingelijn (Dordrecht - Geldermalsen) and is located between Sliedrecht and Hardinxveld-Giessendam. The station is primarily for western Giessendam, where a new housing development is being built and small settlements in the area.

Train services

Bus services

There is no direct bus service at this station.

External links
Qbuzz website 
Dutch Public Transport journey planner 

Railway stations in South Holland
Railway stations opened in 2011
Hardinxveld-Giessendam